Robert Wiemer (died August 21, 2014) was a film and television director, writer, producer and editor.

Director 

 Star Trek: Deep Space Nine
 episode "Profit and Loss"
 SeaQuest DSV
 Star Trek: The Next Generation
 episodes "Data's Day", "Interface", "Lessons", "Masks", "Parallels", "Schisms", "Violations", "Who Watches the Watchers"
 Superboy
 The Night Train to Kathmandu (1988)
 Anna to the Infinite Power (1983)
 Somewhere, Tomorrow (1983)
 Letters (1975)
 The Big Blue Marble

Writer 

 The Night Train to Kathmandu (1988)
 Anna to the Infinite Power (1983)
 Somewhere, Tomorrow (1983)
 The Big Blue Marble

Producer 

 The Night Train to Kathmandu (1988) (executive producer)
 Anna to the Infinite Power (1983)
 Somewhere, Tomorrow (1983) 
 The Big Blue Marble (executive producer)

Editor 
 Letters (1975)

External links

References 

American film directors
American film editors
American film producers
American male screenwriters
American television directors
American television producers
American television writers
Year of birth missing
Place of birth missing
2014 deaths
American male television writers